Lot 52 is a township in Kings County, Prince Edward Island, Canada.  It is part of St. George's Parish. Lot 52 was awarded to Stuart, William, and Stair Douglas in the 1767 land lottery.

References

52
Geography of Kings County, Prince Edward Island